Vauhallan is a commune in the Essonne department in Île-de-France in northern France.

Inhabitants of Vauhallan are known as Vauhallanais.

See also
Communes of the Essonne department

References

External links
Official website 

Mayors of Essonne Association 

Communes of Essonne
Essonne communes articles needing translation from French Wikipedia